Sir Arthur William Fadden,  (13 April 189421 April 1973) was an Australian politician who was the 13th prime minister of Australia, from 29 August to 7 October 1941. He was the leader of the Country Party from 1940 to 1958 and also was federal treasurer for nearly ten years (1940–1941, 1949–1958).

Fadden was born in Ingham, Queensland, to Irish immigrant parents. He was raised in Walkerston, and left school at the age of 15. He was appointed town clerk of Mackay in 1916, but following the 1918 cyclone moved to Townsville and opened an accountancy firm. He was elected to the Townsville City Council in 1930, and in 1932 was elected to the Queensland Legislative Assembly for the Country and Progressive National Party. Fadden lost his seat in 1935, but the following year won a by-election to the federal Division of Darling Downs.

In March 1940, Fadden was named a minister without portfolio in the government of Robert Menzies, who led the United Australia Party in a coalition with the Country Party. A few months later, following the deaths of three senior ministers in an air crash, he took over as Minister for Air and Minister for Civil Aviation. In October 1940, Fadden was elected acting leader of the Country Party as a compromise candidate, following a deadlocked leadership vote between Earle Page and John McEwen. He became the de facto deputy prime minister and was promoted by Menzies to treasurer.

Fadden was acting prime minister for four months early in 1941 (while Menzies was away in Europe), and became popular for his conciliatory manner. He became the official leader of the Country Party following a ballot in March 1941. In August 1941, Menzies resigned as prime minister after losing the confidence of his ministry. Fadden was elected leader of the UAP–Country coalition in his place, and consequently became prime minister. However, he held office for just 39 days before being replaced by John Curtin, whose Labor Party had successfully moved a motion of no confidence. After losing the prime ministership, Fadden continued on as leader of the opposition for two more years. He eventually resigned in favour of Menzies following the coalition's massive defeat at the 1943 election.

When Menzies returned as prime minister in 1949, Fadden became treasurer for a second time, holding office until his retirement from politics in 1958. Only Peter Costello has served in the position for longer. Fadden enjoyed one of the most rapid rises in Australian political history, moving from private citizen to the prime ministership in just 11 years. He was the first prime minister born in Queensland, and the first and only member of the Country Party to become prime minister with his own mandate (rather than just serving as a caretaker after the death of a predecessor).

Early life

Childhood
Fadden was born in Ingham, Queensland, on 13 April 1894. He was the eldest of ten children – seven sons and three daughters – born to Annie (née Moorhead) and Richard John Fadden. His parents were both born in Ireland, his mother in County Tyrone and his father in County Galway. Fadden moved to Walkerston at a young age, where his father was officer-in-charge of the local police station. He had a "typical country childhood", but suffered the deaths of three of his younger siblings in separate accidents. Fadden received his only formal education at the Walkerston State School, except for a brief period at Te Kowai while his usual school was being renovated. His first jobs included collecting cane beetles and performing sound effects at the local cinema. Fadden left school at the age of 15 and began working as a "billy boy" (odd-job man) on a cane-cutting gang at Pleystowe. He later secured an indoor job as an office boy at the Pleystowe Sugar Mill, where his colleagues include two future Labor MPs – Maurice Hynes and George Martens. In his spare time, he developed an interest in the theatre, both as a performer and treasurer of the local company.

Professional career
In April 1913, Fadden moved to Mackay to become assistant town clerk of the Mackay Town Council. He defeated 56 other applicants for the position. In 1916, his superior, Frederick Morley, was dismissed as town clerk over allegations of theft, which Fadden himself had uncovered. Morley eventually received a two-year jail term, and Fadden was promoted in his place, again defeating more than 50 other applicants; he was reputedly the "youngest town clerk in Australia". He had attempted to enlist in the Australian Army the previous year, but was rejected on health grounds. In 1918, Fadden served on the committee of the relief fund for the Mackay cyclone, which devastated the town and killed thirty people. However, he resigned as town clerk in September of that year and moved to Townsville (the largest settlement in North Queensland), where he established his own accountancy firm. He had qualified as an accountant through a correspondence course from a school in Melbourne.

According to his memoirs, Fadden initially struggled to make ends meet as an accountant, and considered relocating to Brisbane. However, he eventually found an unused loophole in the tax code that allowed him to gain a competitive advantage. His business prospered thereafter, and he was able to take on partners and opened a second office in Brisbane. In 1930, Fadden was elected to the Townsville City Council as part of a non-partisan grouping calling themselves the "serviceable six". He developed a feud with the city's chief engineer, Sidney Roberts, whom he publicly criticised for using coal from New South Wales instead of from the local Bowen Basin mines. He was once again able to use his auditing skills to his advantage, getting Roberts fired for inconsistencies in his balance sheets. The resulting publicity was a springboard for his political career.

Early political career

State politics 
At the 1932 Queensland state election, Fadden was elected to the Queensland Legislative Assembly as a member of the Country and Progressive National Party (CPNP). Aided by a favourable redistribution, he won the seat of Kennedy from the Australian Labor Party by just 62 votes. He was the only candidate from his party to win a seat from Labor, which won majority government on a swing of almost 10 points. In parliament, Fadden came to notice as a critic of the new government's financial operations. He accused the government of lacking transparency and accountability, particularly in its use of trust funds which he said had been used to cover up revenue deficiencies. His speeches impressed both his party and political correspondents, and he was asked to write a series of articles for The Courier-Mail.

Fadden was the CPNP's lead speaker in the 1934 budget debates, effectively making him the chief financial spokesman for the opposition. In the lead-up to the 1935 state election, a redistribution turned Kennedy into a safe Labor seat. It was alleged by the opposition that the government had specifically targeted Fadden's seat in order to remove him as a political threat. Faced with certain defeat, he chose to run in the neighbouring seat of Mirani. However, he lost to Labor's Ted Walsh by 224 votes, as the government won a landslide victory. In his memoirs, he accused Labor of having pork-barreled Mirani in the lead-up to the election to ensure his defeat.

Move to federal politics 

After losing his seat in state parliament, Fadden moved to Brisbane, and initially returned to his accounting practice. In early 1936, he joined the Queensland Country Party, which had split from the CPNP in order to align with the federal Country Party. Later that year, he was elected to the Australian House of Representatives at a by-election for the Division of Darling Downs. It was caused by the death of the previous member, Littleton Groom, who was a member of the United Australia Party (UAP). Fadden, who had no previous connection with the area, was the first member of his party to contest the seat; the UAP suffered a negative swing of over 40 points. He consolidated his hold on the seat at the 1937 federal election, held less than a year later.

Menzies Government
In April 1939, Prime Minister Joseph Lyons died in office and was replaced by Country Party leader Earle Page on an interim basis. When Robert Menzies was elected by the United Australia Party (UAP) as Lyons' replacement, Page gave a speech accusing Menzies of disloyalty and questioning his record of military service. As a result of Page's attacks, which they deemed unfair, Fadden and Bernard Corser resigned from the parliamentary Country Party to sit as "Independent Country" members; they were soon followed by Oliver Badman and Thomas Collins. Fadden was generally seen as the leader of the group. When Page was forced out of the leadership in September, they attempted to rejoin the party, but the remaining members opted – by a single vote – not to re-admit them. Archie Cameron, generally seen as Page's ally, was elected as the party's new leader. Fadden did not regard Cameron favourably, in one debate stating: "I take this opportunity to declare without the slightest degree of reservation that the honourable gentleman is not my leader". When asked in another debate if he were still a member of the Country Party, he replied "no, I am not, thank goodness, as it is now constituted and under its present leadership". In early November, however, Cameron invited the four breakaways to rejoin the party in the interests of unity, which they accepted.

The Country Party's coalition with the UAP had lapsed following Menzies' elevation to the prime ministership. In March 1940, Menzies and Cameron agreed to resume the coalition, providing an opportunity for five Country Party members to be added to the ministry. Cameron somewhat unexpectedly nominated Fadden as a Country Party representative, and he was appointed as an assistant minister to the Treasurer of Australia (Percy Spender) and the Minister for Supply and Development (Frederick Stewart). In August 1940, Fadden narrowly escaped being killed in the Canberra air disaster, which claimed the lives of three government ministers and the Chief of the General Staff. He was scheduled to be aboard the flight, which was transporting the ministers back to Canberra after a cabinet meeting in Melbourne, but instead took an overnight train. He traded places with Richard Elford (James Fairbairn's private secretary), who had wanted to stay in Melbourne to celebrate a wedding anniversary; both Elford and Fairbairn were among those killed. After the crash, Fadden replaced Fairbairn as Minister for Air and Minister for Civil Aviation; he also continued as assistant minister to the Treasurer.

The 1940 Australian federal election resulted in a hung parliament. The UAP–Country coalition was able to remain in power with the support of two independent MPs, Alexander Wilson and Arthur Coles. The Country Party lost three seats to the Labor Party, and on 16 October the parliamentary party voted to remove Archie Cameron as leader. John McEwen and Earle Page both nominated for the leadership, and Fadden intended to nominate for the deputy leadership. McEwen and Page were tied at eight votes each after three separate ballots. During a break for dinner, Fadden was asked to become interim leader as a compromise between the two candidates, with the intention that another leadership ballot would be held in a few months. He was then elected unopposed as deputy leader and thus acting leader of the party. According to his biographer Tracey Arklay, "Fadden was selected because the majority in the party room considered that he was the man most likely to be able to broker deals and negotiate with Menzies and the UAP". Edgar Holt believed Fadden's personality was a major factor – "he had no obvious ambitions and he suffered from no delusions of grandeur [...] he was amiable and gregarious" – but also thought that Page had allowed Fadden to assume the leadership in order to deny it to McEwen.

As the acting leader of his party, Fadden became the de facto deputy prime minister and joined the Advisory War Council. He was sworn in as Treasurer on 28 October 1940, succeeding Percy Spender, and presented his first budget less than a month later on 21 November. The budget featured increased levels of spending due to the ongoing war, offset by significant increases in taxation – including a reduction in the tax-free threshold, increased company taxes, and a tax on undistributed profits. In presenting the budget, Fadden noted that it brought about "the heaviest financial imposts ever placed upon the people of Australia". It was highly unpopular among the general public, which up until that point had perceived the war to be still quite distant. The independent MPs contemplated voting with the opposition to reject the budget, but after negotiations and some amendments it was able to be passed, allowing the government to continue in power.

Prime Minister of Australia
In August 1941 Robert Menzies resigned as Prime Minister.  Although the non-Labor Coalition had been in power for a decade, the UAP was so bereft of leadership that on 28 August a joint UAP-Country meeting chose Fadden as Coalition leader even though the Country Party was the smaller of the two non-Labor parties. Fadden was duly sworn in as Prime Minister the next day, and also remained Treasurer. He was the only member of the Country/National Party to serve as Prime Minister without an expectation of a short tenure (the other two Country/National Prime Ministers, Page and McEwen, were caretakers).

Nevertheless, Fadden's term of office was troubled from the start. Even parliamentarians in his own party feared the worst. It was later reported that Fadden decided against moving into The Lodge, the official Prime Minister's residence in Canberra, after his predecessor as  Country Party leader, Cameron, crudely told him that he would "scarcely have enough time to wear a track from the backdoor to the shithouse before you’ll be out".

On 3 October, the two independents who had been keeping the Coalition in office for the last year, Coles and Wilson, voted against Fadden's budget. Coles and Wilson had been so disgusted with how Menzies had been treated that they refused to support the Coalition any longer. Due to this loss of supply, Fadden submitted his government's resignation to the Governor-General Lord Gowrie later the same day. This was the last occasion to date on which an Australian government was forced to resign after being defeated on the floor of the House of Representatives. Fadden joked that he was like the Flood: he had "reigned for 40 days and 40 nights".

The Governor-General was reluctant to call an election for a House that was barely a year old, especially considering that the war had recently been brought to the nation's doorstep with Japan's advances.  However, he would have been left with no other option if Labor leader John Curtin did not have enough support to govern.  With this in mind, Gowrie summoned Coles and Wilson and obtained their assurances that they would support Curtin as Prime Minister and end the instability that had plagued the government since 1940. Coles and Wilson agreed to this, and Curtin was sworn in on 7 October.

Opposition

Leader of the Opposition

Following the fall of his ministry, a joint UAP-Country Party meeting endorsed Fadden as Leader of the Opposition, even though the UAP was nominally the senior coalition partner. As a result, Menzies resigned as UAP leader. The UAP was so bereft of leadership that it was forced to elect 79-year-old former Prime Minister Billy Hughes as its new leader. The Coalition sank into near-paralysis in opposition. Even allowing for Curtin's personal popularity, as well as the significant advantages which an incumbent government in a Westminster system has in wartime, Fadden proved a disappointment as Leader of the Opposition; he was unable to get the better of Curtin.  The Coalition suffered a crushing loss in the 1943 election. It was reduced to 19 seats, including a mere seven for Fadden's Country Party. Accepting responsibility for this severe defeat, Fadden then handed the Opposition leadership back to Menzies, who had resumed the UAP leadership.

Rebuilding the Coalition

After the Coalition was again vanquished at the 1946 election, Fadden resumed his political partnership with Menzies. Two years earlier, Menzies had folded the UAP into the new Liberal Party of Australia. There was some speculation that the Country Party would be included in the merger (as had already happened in several states), but Fadden was keen to assert the independence of his party.

Always an outspoken conservative, in the late 1940s he became a strong anti-communist, urging Menzies to ban the Communist Party of Australia if he ever came to power. Indeed, in the lead up to the 1949 election, Fadden often made inflammatory claims about the "socialist" nature of the Labor Party which Menzies could then "clarify" or repudiate as he saw fit, thus appearing more "moderate". His often extreme views were concealed behind a jolly and jovial public manner and he enjoyed his nickname of "Artie." 

Fadden was a friend of Robert Frederick Bird Wake, one of the country's leading security experts at the time. It was an odd relationship, based on their mutual love of Queensland and Queenslanders. Wake, who was a founder director with the Australian Security Intelligence Organisation (1949), was supplied with inside information by Fadden about security leaks in the UK. Although Wake was more inclined to support the Labor Party, the relationship stood the test of time and proved mutually beneficial.

Treasurer

The Coalition won a massive victory in the 1949 election, and Fadden, who transferred to the newly created seat of the Division of McPherson on the Gold Coast, became Treasurer in the second Menzies government. Although inflation was high in the early 1950s, forcing him to impose several "horror budgets", he generally presided over a booming economy, with times especially good for farmers. 

On the night before the 1954 federal election, Fadden was seriously injured in a car accident while travelling back to Brisbane from Dalby. Near Grantham, the car in which he was travelling failed to negotiate a curve on a slippery road, and rolled three times. Fadden, who had been sitting next to the driver, was pulled from the car unconscious and spent election day in hospital, unable to cast his vote. He was left with injuries to his face, head, and legs, and required five separate operations.

Fadden resigned as leader of the Country Party on 26 March 1958, with John McEwen elected unopposed as his successor. At the same time, he announced that he would retire from politics at the 1958 election. He delivered his eleventh and final budget on 5 August. Although the election was held on 22 November, he did not resign from the ministry until 9 December, remaining in office as treasurer for over two weeks while not being a member of parliament.

Having continued as Treasurer after his resignation as Country Party leader it was unusual that the Treasurer was a member of the junior party of the Coalition who was not also the current party leader.

Fadden and fellow Country Party leader Earle Page are the only Country Party members to have been Treasurers in non-Labor Coalition Governments and Fadden is the only non-Liberal Treasurer in a Liberal-led Coalition Government. Since Fadden's retirement, every Treasurer in  a Coalition Government has been a Liberal.

Final years
After leaving parliament, Fadden pursued business interests across a wide range of industries. He visited Japan twice in 1959, and was appointed as the representative of a Japanese company hoping to acquire a licence to export iron ore from Western Australia. The deal fell through, which he attributed to political interference. Fadden was chairman of Centenary Estates Limited, which built the housing development that became known as the Centenary Suburbs. He took up several company directorships, including with the real estate firm Hooker Finance and the ice-cream manufacturer Toppa. He also worked as a consultant for a sugar mill in Tully, Queensland, and invested in an iron ore deposit at Mourilyan, Queensland. In 1960, he was commissioned by the state government to produce a report into the viability of Central Queensland ports.

In 1969, Fadden published a memoir titled They Called Me Artie. Reviewing the book for The Canberra Times, Don Aitkin observed that Fadden had "the reputation of a political buffoon, a man of earthy wit and hail-fellow-well-metness who survived in politics because he knew more and better stories than the next man [...] his autobiography does little to destroy that picture". Shortly before his death in 1973 he also published a nine-page account of his prime ministership in Australian Outlook, titled "Forty days and forty nights".

Fadden suffered from ill health during his retirement, including a bout of hepatitis and a vision defect that left him blind in one eye and required an operation to correct. He died of leukaemia on 21 April 1973, aged 79, at St Andrew's War Memorial Hospital in Brisbane. A state funeral was held at the Toowong Presbyterian Church on 27 April, followed by cremation at Mt Thompson Crematorium.

Personal life

On 27 December 1916, Fadden married Ilma Nita Thornber (2 April 1895 – 14 May 1987), who worked as a milliner. Her father James Thornber and brother-in-law George Fay both served periods as mayor of Mackay. The couple had four children together – Gordon, John, Mavis, and Betty. His oldest son Gordon predeceased him, dying in 1956 at the age of 34. Arthur Fadden was initiated as a Freemason in Lodge Caledonia, No. 737 S.C. (Mackay, Qld), on 29 July 1915. After being elected to the Australian Parliament on 19 December 1936, he joined Lamington Lodge, No. 110 U.G.L.Q.(Brisbane, Qld), on 4 February 1937.  Bro. Sir Arthur Fadden remained a member of Lamington Lodge, No. 110 U.G.L.Q., until he resigned in March 1973, a month before his passing.<ref><></McInnes, Dianne.  Lamington Lodge: 100 Years of Freemasonry, 1996.</ref>

Arthur Fadden was once a member of an acting group in Mackay called the "Nigger Minstrel Troupe".

Honours

Fadden was appointed to the Privy Council in 1942, which granted him the style "Right Honourable", and was made a Knight Commander of the Order of St Michael and St George (KCMG) in 1951. He was knighted in person by King George VI in London on 31 January 1952, only a week before the King's death, and formally sworn of the Privy Council the following day. In his memoirs he recalled that the King had accidentally knighted him as "Sir William" (his middle name). He corrected the King who knighted him again as "Sir Arthur". Fadden was raised to Knight Grand Cross (GCMG) of the order in 1958, to mark his retirement from politics. In 1972, he was made a Doctor of Laws honoris causa by the University of Queensland.

After Fadden's death, the Canberra suburb of Fadden and the federal electoral Division of Fadden were named in his honour, as is traditional for Australian prime ministers. In 1975 he was honoured on a postage stamp bearing his portrait issued by Australia Post. In 1976, the Sir Arthur Fadden Memorial Garden was established in the Brisbane suburb of Mount Ommaney, consisting of 3,000 trees.

See also
 Fadden Ministry

Notes

References

Further reading
Arklay, T. (2014) Political Silhouette, Australian Scholarly: Melbourne. .
 Fadden, Arthur (1969), They Called Me Artie, Jacaranda Press
Hughes, Colin A (1976), Mr Prime Minister. Australian Prime Ministers 1901-1972, Oxford University Press, Melbourne, Victoria, Ch.14.

External links

Prime Ministers of Australia
Treasurers of Australia
Members of the Cabinet of Australia
Australian Leaders of the Opposition
Members of the Australian House of Representatives
Members of the Australian House of Representatives for Darling Downs
Members of the Australian House of Representatives for McPherson
National Party of Australia members of the Parliament of Australia
Australian accountants
Australian people of World War II
Australian Presbyterians
World War II political leaders
Australian Knights Grand Cross of the Order of St Michael and St George
Australian politicians awarded knighthoods
Australian monarchists
1894 births
1973 deaths
Members of the Queensland Legislative Assembly
Australian Freemasons
Leaders of the National Party of Australia
20th-century Australian politicians
Australian members of the Privy Council of the United Kingdom
Australian people of Irish descent
Australian people of Northern Ireland descent
Australian memoirists
20th-century memoirists